Juan Capistrano Sepulveda (1814–1898) was an early California politician and pioneer in Los Angeles. He was a member of the prominent Sepúlveda family of California.

Juan Capistrano Sepulveda was a son of Jose Dolores Sepulveda (1793 - 1824).  He served on the third Los Angeles County Board of Supervisors in 1854 for the 3rd District.  The County Supervisors in 1854 were David W. Alexander, Stephen C. Foster, Juan Sepulveda, Cristobal Aguilar, and Samuel S. Thompson.

References

Californios
1814 births
1898 deaths
California pioneers
Los Angeles County Board of Supervisors
19th-century American politicians